The Tejano Monument is a memorial commemorating the impact of Tejanos on Texas culture and history, installed on the Texas State Capitol grounds in Austin, Texas, United States. The monument was sculpted by Armando Hinojosa and erected by Tejano Monument, Inc. in 2012. It features nine life-size bronze statues on a 275-ton Texas Sunset Red Granite base, and five plaques describing Tejano history.

See also

 2012 in art

References

2012 establishments in Texas
2012 sculptures
Bronze sculptures in Texas
Granite sculptures in Texas
Hispanic and Latino American culture in Austin, Texas
Monuments and memorials in Texas
Outdoor sculptures in Austin, Texas
Statues in Texas
Tejano culture